Alida is a ghost town in Smoky Hill township of Geary County, Kansas, United States.

History
Alida was founded in 1858.  It was razed in 1966-1967 during the construction of Milford Lake.  The communities of Alida and Broughton were razed, while the cities of Wakefield and Milford were moved to higher ground. The population in 1910 was 48.

References

Further reading

External links
 Geary County maps: Current, Historic, KDOT

Ghost towns in Kansas